Leonid Pavlovich Kraizmer (29 May, 1912 – 2002) was leading Soviet cybernetician who was active in Leningrad before moving to Akademgorodok, Novosibirsk, Russia.

Publications in English
 Bionics (1963) U.S. Dept. of Commerce, Office of Technical Services, Joint Publications Research Service
 Technical Cybernetics (1967) translation of Tekhnicheskaia kibernetika (1958) Moscow: Energiia Moskva
 High Speed Ferromagnetic Memory Units'' (1967)

References

Soviet cyberneticists